Sona Shahinyan (born 21 January 1992) is an Armenian professional footballer who plays as a defender. She played in the Armenia women's national team.

Shahinyan joined the Armenian National Team in 2010 after playing for both the U17 and U19 levels. Sona wears number 16. During her career, she played for FC. Furman, Yerevan 2007-2008 and then FC. Urartu, Yerevan in 2008-2010.

See also
List of Armenia women's international footballers

References

External links
 

1992 births
Living people
Women's association football defenders
Armenian women's footballers
Armenia women's international footballers